The Tora Bora Military Front (Pashto:  Tora Bora Nizami Mahaz) is an insurgent group in Nangarhar Province, Afghanistan. It is led by Anwarul Haq Mujahid. The faction broke away from Hezb-e Islami Khalis (HiK) following the death of HiK's leader Mohammad Yunus Khalis and an ensuing power struggle between Mujahid and Haji Din Mohammad.

Anwar ul Haq has pledged allegiance to the leadership of the Taliban

The organization has published a magazine and website.

References

External links
 World almanac of Islamism 2011

Jihadist groups in Afghanistan
Jihadist groups in Pakistan
Nangarhar Province
Taliban
Paramilitary organisations based in Afghanistan